The striped wren-babbler (Kenopia striata) is a species of bird in the family Pellorneidae. It is monotypic within the genus Kenopia. It is found in Brunei, Indonesia, Malaysia, and Thailand. Its natural habitats are subtropical or tropical moist lowland forest and subtropical or tropical swampland. It is threatened by habitat loss.

References

Collar, N. J. & Robson, C. 2007. Family Timaliidae (Babblers) pp. 70 – 291 in; del Hoyo, J., Elliott, A. & Christie, D.A. eds. Handbook of the Birds of the World, Vol. 12. Picathartes to Tits and Chickadees. Lynx Edicions, Barcelona.

striped wren-babbler
Birds of Malesia
striped wren-babbler
striped wren-babbler
Taxonomy articles created by Polbot